Kentucky Route 85 (KY 85) is a  state highway in Kentucky that runs from Kentucky Route 70 east of Madisonville to U.S. Route 62 northeast of Rockport via Sacramento and Centertown.

Route Description
KY 85 begins at KY 70 near Anton which then entering to that town. After leaving it, it makes the southern terminus of KY 2082 it then passes into KY 862. While then it passes into the Mclean County and into a small river named Pond River. Then, It then passes into the town of Sacramento. Where it makes concurrency and also making the eastern terminus of KY 254. It then leaves the concurrency to making two southern terminus of KY 2383 and KY 2109. Next, it makes another terminus at KY 2226 it then enters the town of Island and making junctions with KY 85 Bus. and US 431 and also, Makes a concurrency with KY 1412. Finally it passes into the Ohio County.
After it passes into that county, it goes near a power plant. It then enters the town of Centertown making a concurrency with KY 69. After that it turns into a rural secondary highway and also making the northern terminus of KY 1903. Also, it finally ends at US 62.

Major intersections

Hopkins County + KY 81 Overlap + McLean County = 21.858

References

0085
Transportation in Hopkins County, Kentucky
Transportation in McLean County, Kentucky
Transportation in Ohio County, Kentucky